The 2019–20 Birmingham City W.F.C. season was the club's 52nd season in existence and their ninth in the FA Women's Super League, the highest level of the football pyramid, having been founding members of the league in 2011. Along with competing in the WSL, the club also contested two domestic cup competitions: the FA Cup and the League Cup.

On 13 March 2020, in line with the FA's response to the coronavirus pandemic, it was announced the season was temporarily suspended until at least 3 April 2020. After further postponements, the season was ultimately ended prematurely on 25 May 2020 with immediate effect. Birmingham sat in 11th at the time and retained their position on sporting merit after The FA Board's decision to award places on a points-per-game basis.

Squad

FA Women's Super League

Results summary

Results by matchday

Results

League table

Women's FA Cup 

As a member of the top two tiers, Birmingham entered the FA Cup in the fourth round. The round was played on 26 January 2020 with Birmingham beating Championship side Sheffield United. Former Sunderland player Lucy Staniforth scored the only goal against the third-tier team before being sent off against her old club in a fifth round victory, setting up an all-WSL tie against Brighton & Hove Albion in the quarter-finals. However, the match was postponed due to the coronavirus pandemic before the season was ultimately curtailed. On 24 July 2020 it was announced the 2019–20 FA Cup would resume play during the 2020–21 season starting with the quarter-final ties rescheduled for the weekend of 26/27 September 2020.

FA Women's League Cup

Group stage

Squad statistics

Appearances 

Starting appearances are listed first, followed by substitute appearances after the + symbol where applicable.

|-
|colspan="14"|Joined during 2020–21 season but competed in the postponed 2019–20 FA Cup:

|}

Goalscorers

Transfers

Transfers in

Loans in

Transfers out

References 

Birmingham City
Birmingham City L.F.C. seasons